Hyposmocoma carnivora is a species of moth of the family Cosmopterigidae. It is endemic to Hawaii.

The larvae have been reared on snails of the genus Tornatellides and pupae of Drosophila melanogaster. They have also been observed preying on other Hyposmocoma larvae and even cannibalise larvae of their own species. The larvae live in a larval case which has the form of an elongated structure with one entrance at each end. It is decorated with bits of sand, pebbles and plant fibers, finely woven between silk filaments. It is covered with orange beige scales probably deposited by the adults during emergence.

Etymology
The specific name carnivora (flesh eater) is derived from the unusual and remarkable feeding habit of the caterpillars.

References

carnivora
Endemic moths of Hawaii
Moths described in 2011